Jacques Alméras (born 30 January 1949 in Montpellier) is a French former racing driver and co-founder of Alméras Frères with his brother Jean-Marie Alméras.

References

1949 births
Living people
French racing drivers
24 Hours of Le Mans drivers
World Sportscar Championship drivers
Sportspeople from Montpellier
20th-century French people